The Federal Flood Commission (FFC) is an agency under the Ministry of Water Resources of the Government of Pakistan, responsible for the development and maintenance of flood protection and control systems in Pakistan.

Before the Federal Flood Commission was established in 1977, the provincial governments of Pakistan were responsible for flood prevention. After the heavy floods of 1973 and 1976, the Federal Flood commission (FFC) was established to coordinate anti-flood measures on a nationwide scale.

See also
 National Disaster Management Authority
 2010 Pakistan floods
 Floods in Pakistan

References

External links
 Federal Flood Commission

Pakistan federal departments and agencies
Emergency management in Pakistan
1977 establishments in Pakistan
Government agencies established in 1977
Ministry of Water Resources (Pakistan)